"Runnin' is a collaboration single of the Filipino boy group BGYO and Filipino singer-songwriter Keiko Necesario. The official track was released on 18 June 2021 as a Digital Single by Star Music. It was BGYO's second single to co-write after The Light and the second collaboration track after Feel Good Pilipinas with KZ Tandingan. It was produced virtually as part of the 4th Season of  Coke Studio: Itodo Mo Beat Mo.

"Runnin surpassed 20,000 streams on Spotify a week after of its release.

Composition and lyrics

"Runnin is a moody song that runs for a total of three minutes and twenty-eight seconds. The song is set in common time with a tempo of 98 beats per minute and written in the key of B major. Most of its lyrics were written in Filipino, except with the Hook and Bridge part as it was written in English, composed by Keiko Necesario and BGYO (Akira Morishita, Gelo Rivera, JL Toreliza, Mikki Claver, Nate Porcalla).
	
Underoneceiling.com labeled "Runnin as "a contemporary pop ballad that contains elements of R&B".

Background and release

"Runnin was first revealed on the fourth episode of  Coke Studio: Itodo Mo Beat Mo on 20 May 2021. The official lyric video was first uploaded on YouTube by Coke Studio Philippines, on 21 May 2021.
	
On 18 June 2021, the track was officially released as a single via digital download accompanied by a new lyric video uploaded by Star Music on YouTube.

The official music video was premiered on Coke Studio Philippines' YouTube channel on 13 July 2021.

Reception

JE C.C. of Dailypedia considered the single as "the perfect mental health awareness campaign song, [that] recounts our gloomy and depressing moments first, reminding us that happiness is a choice and that we can easily shrug off our bad moments by deciding to move forward". The Filipino News described the track as "a song, about pushing on, despite challenges". Underoneceiling.com called the song "the first non-upbeat track of BGYO with smooth vocals". Star Cinema have cited "major LSS with BGYO and Keiko Necesario's new song Runnin.

Music video

The music video of "Runnin was produced by Coke Studio Philippines as part of the 57th episode of the 4th Season of  Coke Studio: Itodo Mo Beat Mo and was presented in an amusement park wherein BGYO (Gelo, Akira, JL, Mikki, Nate) and Keiko Necesario having fun and enjoying their time, with photographs flashing throughout the song.

See also
BGYO discography
List of BGYO live performances

References

External links
 

 

BGYO songs
Keiko Necesario songs
2021 songs
2021 singles
Star Music singles
Taglish songs